Frontierland is one of the "themed lands" at the many Disneyland-style parks run by Disney around the world.  Themed to the American Frontier of the 19th century, Frontierlands are home to cowboys and pioneers, saloons, red rock buttes and gold rushes along with some influence from American history and North America in general. It is named Westernland at Tokyo Disneyland and Grizzly Gulch at Hong Kong Disneyland.

To build an accurate depiction of an old-West town, Walt Disney sent a camera crew to Frontier Town, in North Hudson, New York, to film a movie that was used as the inspiration for Frontierland, as revealed in the book, "Frontier Town Then And Now."

Disneyland

History
Frontierland first appeared in Disneyland as one of five original themed lands.  Initiated by Walt Disney, in the beginning, the land contained few attractions, but centered on open expanses of wilderness which guests traveled through by stagecoach, pack mules, Conestoga wagon, and walking trails.  The Mine Train Through Nature's Wonderland opened in 1960, consisting of a sedate train ride around various western landscape dioramas.  The Mine Train closed in 1977 to make way for a new attraction; the Big Thunder Mountain Railroad, which opened in 1979.

Disneyland's Frontierland gateway is constructed of ponderosa pine logs. The land's long shoreline along the Rivers of America is considered a prime viewing location for the nighttime Fantasmic! show.  The docks to both the Mark Twain Riverboat and the Sailing Ship Columbia, (a replica of American explorer Robert Gray's 18th century ship that circumnavigated the globe) are located here, and Tom Sawyer Island in the river's center is also considered a property of Frontierland

On the roof of the Westward Ho Trading Co., there are elk or deer antlers. Elk antlers were commonly placed on general stores in the old west so cowboys coming into town immediately knew where to get supplies. Also in Frontierland is a building that has a large sign that says "Laod Bhang Co. Fireworks Factory". Plus, at the storefront marked "Crockett and Russel Hat Co.", there is a window honoring Fess Parker, who played Davy Crockett in Walt Disney's Davy Crockett. Frontierland borders Fantasyland (via the Big Thunder Trail), New Orleans Square and Adventureland, and connects to the Central Plaza through an iconic set of fort-style gates.

Attractions and entertainment
 Big Thunder Mountain Railroad (1979–present)
 Frontierland Shootin' Arcade
 Mark Twain Riverboat (1955-2016 and 2017–present)
 Pirate's Lair on Tom Sawyer Island (1956-2016 and 2017–present)
 Sailing Ship Columbia (1958–present)
 Fantasmic! (1992-2016 and 2017–present)

Former attractions and entertainment
 American Rifle Exhibit & Frontier Gun Shop (1956–1986)
 Big Thunder Ranch (1986–1996, 2005–2016)
 Burning Settler's Cabin (1956–2003)
 Ceremonial Dance Circle (1955–1971)
 Conestoga Wagons (1955–1959)
 Davy Crockett Arcade (1955–1987)
 Davy Crockett Frontier Museum (1955)
 Dixieland Band Stand (1955–1961)
 El Zocalo (1958–1963)
 Festival of Fools (1996–1998)
 Fort Wilderness (1956–2003)
 Indian Village (1955–1971)
 Little Patch of Heaven Petting Farm (2004–2005)
 Marshal's Office (1955–1956)
 Mexican Village (1957–1964)
 Mike Fink Keel Boats (1955–1997)
 Mineral Hall (1956–1962)
 Miniature Horse Corral (1955–1957)
 Nature's Wonderland (1960–1977)
 Painted Desert (1955–1959)
 Rainbow Caverns Mine Train (1956–1960)
 Rainbow Ridge Pack Mules (1955–1973)
 Santa's Reindeer Round-Up (2005–2007) Seasonal
 Stagecoach Ride (1955–1959)
 Woody's Roundup (1999–2000)

Restaurants and refreshments
The Golden Horseshoe Cafe
Stage Door Cafe
Rancho del Zocalo Restaurante
River Belle Terrace

Former restaurants and refreshments
 Aunt Jemima's Kitchen (1962–1970, 1975–2003)
 Aunt Jemima's Pancake House (1955–1962)
 Casa de Fritos (1955–1982)
 Casa Mexicana (1982–2001)
 Chicken Plantation (1955–1962)
 Magnolia Tree Terrace (1970–1971)
McDonald's Conestoga Fries (1998–2007)
 New Orleans Barbecue (1956–1957)
 Oaks Tavern (1956–1978)
 Silver Banjo Barbecue (1957–1961)

Shops
Bonanza Outfitters
Westward Ho Trading Company
Pioneer Mercantile
Silver Spur

Former shops
 Frontier Trading Post (1955–1987)
 Pendleton Woolen Mills Dry Goods Store (1955–1990)
 Malt Shop & Cone Shop (1958–1970)
 Quasimodo's Attic (1996–1997)

Magic Kingdom

Frontierland at Walt Disney World debuted with only three attractions: the Walt Disney World Railroad station, Davy Crockett's Explorer Canoes (which operated until 1994) and the world debut of the Country Bear Jamboree. Tom Sawyer Island opened in 1973. The northwestern end of the park was supposed to receive a massive, pavilion-style "E ticket" attraction, which was never built. The area sat empty until Big Thunder Mountain Railroad premiered in 1980.

Few changes would be made until 1991, when Splash Mountain was built on the vacant land between Big Thunder Mountain Railroad and the Walt Disney World Railroad station and parade access road, necessitating the relocation of the railroad's station. Splash Mountain and a new two-story railroad station opened on October 2, 1992. Frontierland borders Adventureland on the south, Liberty Square on the east, and the Rivers of America on the north.

On June 25, 2020, Disney announced that they will be reworking Splash Mountain to a new ride, based on the 2009 animated film, The Princess and the Frog. The project had been in discussion since 2019 and is being overseen by Walt Disney Imagineer Senior Creative Producer Charita Carter with Splash Mountain's original creator Tony Baxter serving as a creative adviser.

Attractions and entertainment
 Big Thunder Mountain Railroad (1980–present)
 Country Bear Jamboree (1971–present)
 Frontierland Shootin' Arcade
 Frontierland Hoedown Happening
 Tom Sawyer Island (1973–present)
 Walt Disney World Railroad (1971–present)

Upcoming attractions and entertainment 
Tiana's Bayou Adventure (Opening in 2024)

Former attractions
 Country Bear Vacation Hoedown (1986—1992)
 Country Bear Christmas Special (1984—2005)
 Davy Crockett's Explorer Canoes (1971—1994)
 Splash Mountain (1992—2023)

Restaurants and refreshments
 Diamond Horseshoe
 Golden Oak Outpost
 Pecos Bill Tall Tale Inn & Café
 Westward Ho

Shops
 Big Al's
 Frontier Trading Post
 Prairie Outpost and Supply

Former shops
 Briar Patch

Tokyo Disneyland

Tokyo Disneyland's instance is known as Westernland, as "frontier" does not adequately translate into the Japanese language. The Mark Twain sails this park's Rivers of America.  Other than differences in placement, and minor variations in color, theming and name, the land is very similar to the Frontierland and Liberty Square areas of the Magic Kingdom.

Attractions and entertainment
 Big Thunder Mountain (1987–present)
 Country Bear Theater (1983–present)
 Horseshoe Roundup
 Mark Twain Riverboat (1983–present)
The Diamond Horseshoe Presents "Mickey & Company"
 Tom Sawyer Island Rafts (1983–present)
 Westernland Shootin' Gallery

Former attractions and entertainment
 Davy Crockett Explorer Canoes (1983-1992)
 Super-Duper Jumpin' Time (2005-2018)
Pecos Goofy's Frontier Revue
The Diamond Horseshoe
Wild West Chance（2016-2018）
Roundup and Play（2016-2018）

Restaurants and refreshments
Cowboy Cookhouse
Camp Woodchuck Kitchen
Hungry Bear Restaurant
Plaza Pavilion Restaurant
Pecos Bill Cafe
The Diamond Horseshoe

Former Restaurants and refreshments 
The Canteen（-2019）
Chuck Wagon（-2019）

Shops
Frontier Woodcraft
Western Wear
General Store
Westernland Picture Parlour
Trading Post
Country Bear Bandwagon
Happy Camper Supplies

Disneyland Park (Paris)
Located in the area that is traditionally occupied by Adventureland, Frontierland at Disneyland Park opened with Euro Disneyland in 1992.  Unlike all of the other instances, this instance has an elaborate backstory concerning the town of Thunder Mesa, founded by Henry Ravenswood to support the mining of Big Thunder Mountain.  This backstory also serves as the foundation for several of the attractions, such as Phantom Manor, a version of the popular Haunted Mansion attraction that can be found at some of the other parks featuring a Western theme and a darker tone to fit in with the rest of Frontierland.  The land is the largest of all of the Frontierlands thus far, containing the entire Rivers of the Far West within its borders.

Two riverboats circle the river here, the Molly Brown and the Mark Twain.  Critter Corral was an old area of the land converted into Woody Roundup, a meet and greet area with Woody from Toy Story and Jessie from Toy Story 2. It was later rethemed into an Arendelle market for the Frozen Fun season and is currently used as a special meet and greet environment for the Signature Experience in the Lion King and Jungle Festival. The land is converted into 'Halloweenland' in October, with many pumpkins and other scary characters lurking around every corner. Frontierland borders Adventureland and the Central Plaza of Main Street USA via Fort Comstock.

In October 2008, for the first time in Disney history Jack Skellington and Sally from Tim Burton's The Nightmare Before Christmas made appearances as meet and greet characters in Halloween and Christmas overlay. They were situated outside Phantom Manor.

Attractions and entertainment
 Big Thunder Mountain (1992–present)
 Frontierland Theater
 The Lion King: Rhythms of the Pride Lands
 Disneyland Railroad - Frontierland Depot (1992–present)
 Legends of the Wild West (1993–present)
 Phantom Manor (1992-2018 and 2019–present)
 Frontierland Playground (formerly Pocahontas Indian Village)
 Rustler Roundup Shootin' Gallery
 Thunder Mesa Riverboat Landing (1992–present)
 The Lucky Nugget Orchestra

Former attractions and entertainment
 Critter Corral (1992–2006)
 The Chaparral Theater
 Pocahontas le Spectacle
 Tarzan: The Encounter
 Mickey's Winter Wonderland 
 Goofy Summer Camp
 "La Forêt de l'Enchantement: Une aventure musicale Disney"
 "Frozen Sing-Along"
 Woodcarver's Workshop
 Pueblo Trading Post
 Indian Canoes
 Woody's Roundup Village
 Meet Mickey Mouse (Temporary)
 River Keel Boats

Restaurants and refreshments
 The Lucky Nugget Saloon
 Last Chance Café
 Palais de Tiana (Tiana's Palace)
 Rafraîchissements Sleepy Hollow (Sleepy Hollow Refreshments)
 Silver Spur Steakhouse
 Fuente Del Oro Restaurante
 Cowboy Cookout Barbecue

Shops
 Thunder Mesa Mercantile Building
 Tobias Norton & Sons
 Bonanza Outfitters
 Eureka Mining Supplies
 Big Thunder Photographer

Hong Kong Disneyland

In 2012, Grizzly Gulch (Cantonese: 灰熊山谷)  opened as the park's equivalent to Frontierland. Grizzly Gulch is much smaller compared to the "Frontierlands" of other Disney Parks, featuring only one ride, Big Grizzly Mountain Runaway Mine Cars. This roller coaster attraction provides a cross between the Big Thunder Mountain Railroads of the classic Frontierlands with elements from Expedition Everest, featuring special ride elements unique to this attraction, including backwards portions, and a high speed launch section.

Grizzly Gulch is themed as a Northern California mining town established on August 8, 1888, a founding date chosen as "the luckiest day of the luckiest month of the luckiest year". Though geyser fields disrupted the initial settlements, the town eventually found success when a family of bears lead one of the prospectors to a bountiful gold find, resulting in the establishment of the Big Grizzly Mountain Mining Company. The bears were declared as being a lucky charm for the town and were given protected status, despite their activity occasionally disrupting work in the mines.

Grizzly Gulch

Attractions and entertainment
 Big Grizzly Mountain Runaway Mine Cars (2012–present)
 Geyser Gulch
 Welcome Wagon Show
 Wild West Photo Fun

Restaurants and refreshments
Lucky Nugget Saloon

Shops
Bear Necessities

References

External links
 WDWHistorys Frontierland Page
 Grizzly Gulch at Hong Kong Disneyland (official webpage)

 
American frontier
Themed areas in Walt Disney Parks and Resorts
Disneyland
Magic Kingdom
Tokyo Disneyland
Disneyland Park (Paris)
Hong Kong Disneyland
Amusement parks opened in 1955
1955 establishments in California